Dommeldange railway station is a railway station serving Dommeldange, a quarter in the north-east of Luxembourg City, in southern Luxembourg.  It is operated by Chemins de Fer Luxembourgeois, the state-owned railway company.

The station is situated on Line 10, which connects Luxembourg City to the centre and north of the country.

External links
 Official CFL page on Dommeldange station
 Rail.lu page on Dommeldange station

Railway stations in Luxembourg City
Railway stations on CFL Line 10